Mitzi Jonelle Tan (born October 27, 1997) is a Filipino climate justice activist. She lives in Metro Manila, Philippines.

Biography

2017 
Tan's activism started in 2017 after meeting with indigenous leaders in her country. This made her realize that collective action and system change are necessary to create a more just and green society.

2019 
In 2019, Tan co-founded Youth Advocates for Climate Action Philippines (YACAP), the Fridays For Future (FFF) organization of the Philippines, following climate demonstrations around the world. Tan is the lead convener and international spokesperson of YACAP. Tan is also a Fridays for Future activist in the Philippines, and spokesperson.

Tan was part of the move to take school strikes for climate online at the start of the Covid-19 pandemic.

2020 
In September 2020, Tan was part of a move to return to 'safe' climate protests. In late 2020, Tan was one of the volunteers who organised Mock COP26, which had delegates from 140 countries. She also gave a talk at Mock COP26 on being an activist living where activism is equated with terrorism. Commenting on Mock COP26 Tan told The Guardian "They're making sure that the voices of the most affected areas are amplified, and making sure that we have a space and we're not just tokenised." She was one of the activists to take part in the Fridays For Future 'Pass the Mic' campaign, also in late 2020, to request that Attenborough pass on his Instagram account to youth advocates, particularly from the Global South.

In November 2020 Tan backed the Climate Live series of international concerts to be held in 2021.

Tan's organisation went into action following the 2020 back-to-back hurricanes in the Philippines to help the most impacted communities, including by feeding the hungry and talking to them about the problems they faced.

2021 
Tan is also one of the Fridays for Future activists leading the 2021 Clean Up Standard Chartered campaign of Fridays for Future, a divestment campaign calling on Standard Chartered Bank to divest from companies involved in the coal industry around the world.

Tan has addressed gender stereotypes and sexism that she faces in her activism, as women are often ignored or dismissed. She has also noted that climate education is typically "alienating, Western, too technical, and not empowering at all," in relation to the approach that she takes as an activist. Tan has also spoken up about "red-tagging," a practice of government officials and supporters in the Philippines where activists and opposition are branded as communists or terrorists, and how it has negative effects on the participation of the youth in the climate movement in her country.

Tan has provided inspiration to others, such as the Indonesian youth activist Salsabila Khairunnisa.

Education 
She has led climate action strikes at the University of the Philippines, where she graduated in mathematics.

Collaboration with other activists 
Tan along with four other activists from MAPA (Most Affected People and Areas) countries, Eyal Weintraub of Argentina, Disha A Ravi of India, Kevin Mtai of Kenya, and Laura Verónica Muñoz of Colombia, along with Greta Thunberg have announced a new wave of climate strikes. While announcing climate strikes Tan has called for "annual binding carbon targets and immediate cuts in emissions in all sectors of our economy." She also said: "If we don't act now, we won't even have a chance to achieve those 2030 and 2050 goals that world leaders keep talking about."

See also 
 Environmental issues in the Philippines

References

1997 births
People from Manila
Climate activists
Living people
Youth climate activists
University of the Philippines alumni